Orbis is the Foreign Policy Research Institute's (FPRI) quarterly journal of world affairs. Published by Elsevier on behalf of the FPRI, an American think tank, it was founded in 1957 by Robert Strausz-Hupé as a forum for policymakers, scholars, and the public who sought debate that they believed was not found in the journals of that time.

Over 60 years later, Orbis publishes articles on topics relating to American foreign policy and national security and analysis of international developments. The journal is edited by Nikolas Gvosdev (Naval War College). Other recent editors include James Kurth (Swarthmore College, 2005–2007), David Eisenhower (University of Pennsylvania, 2001–2004), and Walter A. McDougall (University of Pennsylvania, 1995–2001).

References

External links 
 

International relations journals
Publications established in 1957
Elsevier academic journals
English-language journals
Quarterly journals